Sergio Michel "Checo" Pérez Mendoza (born 26 January 1990), is a Mexican racing driver who races in Formula One for Red Bull Racing, having previously driven for Sauber, McLaren, Force India, and Racing Point. He won his first Formula One Grand Prix at the 2020 Sakhir Grand Prix, breaking the record for the number of starts before a race win at 190. He also earned his first Formula One pole position at the 2022 Saudi Arabian Grand Prix, breaking the record for the most races before a first pole position at 215. Pérez has a contract with Red Bull Racing until the end of the 2024 season.

Up until 2012, Pérez was a member of the Ferrari Driver Academy. He made his Formula One debut driving for Sauber during the 2011 season. He took his first Formula One podium at the 2012 Malaysian Grand Prix with Sauber. Due to his young age and performance, he was referred to as "The Mexican Wunderkind". Pérez joined McLaren for the 2013 season, but the team did not score a single podium finish. Subsequently, the team decided to replace Pérez with Kevin Magnussen for the 2014 season.

Force India signed Pérez for the 2014 season with a €15 million contract. He remained with Force India when the team went into administration in 2018 and reformed as the Racing Point team for 2019. In 2019, Racing Point signed a three-year extension with Pérez. In September 2020, Racing Point announced that Pérez would be leaving the team at the end of the season as Sebastian Vettel, a four-time F1 world champion, had been signed to replace him. In December, Pérez signed with Red Bull Racing for the 2021 season.

Personal life 
Born in Guadalajara, Jalisco, Mexico, Pérez is the youngest child of Antonio Pérez Garibay and Marilú Mendoza de Pérez; he also has an older sister Paola and an older brother Antonio, a retired stock car racing driver who competed in the NASCAR Mexico Series. Pérez is married to Carola Martínez, and they have three children. Pérez is a Catholic.

Both Pérez brothers are association football fans, stating that they thought about leaving car racing to play professionally. The brothers are friends of Mexican footballer Javier Hernández. In an interview in 2012 for the official Formula One website, Pérez revealed that if he had not been a driver he would have liked to be a lawyer.

In November 2012, Pérez unveiled the Checo Pérez Foundation to support orphans and children with cancer. His sister Paola was the foundation's president.

Early career

Karting
Pérez began his career in karting at the age of six in 1996. In his first year of competition he achieved four victories in the junior category and claimed the runner-up spot in the category. In 1997, he participated in the karting Youth Class, where he was the youngest driver in the category and earned a win and five podium finishes and finished fourth in the championship.

The following year, he returned to compete in the junior category; he achieved eight wins and became the youngest driver to become champion of the category. He also participated in several races in Shifter 125cc and competed in Master Kadets, where he finished on the podium.

In 1999, he raced in the 80cc Shifter category, taking three wins and finishing third in the championship. He also became the youngest driver to win a competition in the category, after obtaining special permission from the Federation to participate in the 80cc Shifter.

In 2000, he raced in the Shifter 80cc Championship and also participated in three races in the Shifter 125cc category, which was part of the Telmex Challenge. The following year saw him become the youngest driver to compete in the 125cc Shifter Regional category. By now, his achievements were bringing hm to the attention of scouts for Escuderia Telmex.

With six wins in 2002, Pérez finished as the national runner-up in the Shifter 125cc category, and participated in the global race Shifter 80cc, in Las Vegas, where he qualified fifth and finished in 11th place.

In 2003, he was leading both championships in the 125cc category but withdrew from the last seven races, which proved to be a disappointment in his title aspirations. However, he finished in third place in Telmex Challenge, in addition to being Cup runner-up in Mexico. In the same year, he was also invited to attend the Easy Kart 125 Shootout, where he competed against drivers from around the world and won the race, again as the youngest driver.

Skip Barber
Pérez competed in the US-based Skip Barber National Championship in 2004. Driving for a team sponsored by Mexican telecommunications company Telmex, he finished eleventh in the championship.

Formula BMW
Pérez moved to Europe in 2005 to compete in the German Formula BMW ADAC series. He was allowed to live in a restaurant owned by his team manager for four months. He finished fourteenth in the championship, driving for 4speed Media, and improved to sixth position the following year.

A1 Grand Prix
In the 2006–07 A1 Grand Prix season, Pérez took part in a single round of the championship for A1 Team Mexico. He was the third-youngest driver to take part in the series.

Formula Three
Pérez switched to the British Formula 3 Championship for 2007. Pérez relocated his residence to Oxford. He competed in the National Class – for older chassis – with the T-Sport team, winning the championship by a comfortable margin. In the process, he won two-thirds of the races and a similar proportion of pole positions, and finished all but two races on the podium.

For 2008, he and T-Sport graduated to the premier International Class of the championship, where he was one of the few drivers to be equipped with a Mugen Honda engine. After leading the championship early in the season, he eventually finished fourth in the drivers' standings.

GP2 Series

Pérez drove for the Campos Grand Prix team in the 2008–09 GP2 Asia Series, partnering Russian driver Vitaly Petrov. He was the first Mexican driver to compete at this level of motorsport since Giovanni Aloi took part in International Formula 3000 in 1990. He won his first GP2 Asia Series race at Sakhir, winning from lights-to-flag in the sprint race having started from pole position. He added a second win at Losail, during the sprint race of the night meeting in Qatar.

He moved to Arden International for the main 2009 GP2 Series, driving alongside fellow Formula Three graduate Edoardo Mortara. Pérez finished twelfth in the standings, with a best result of second coming at Valencia. In the off-season, he contested two rounds of the 2009–10 GP2 Asia Series for Barwa Addax, ahead of a 2010 main series campaign with the team. He won five races, and finished second in the standings behind Pastor Maldonado.

Formula One

Sauber (2011–2012)

2011 season

Sauber subsequently announced a partnership with Pérez's sponsor Telmex. He became the fifth Mexican to compete in Formula One, and the first since Héctor Rebaque competed between 1977 and 1981. He also became a member of the Ferrari Driver Academy scheme in October 2010.

However, both Sauber cars were subsequently disqualified for infringing technical regulations. He failed to repeat the result in Malaysia where body parts flew off Sébastien Buemi's Toro Rosso car and into the electrical system of Pérez's Sauber, forcing his retirement. The  saw him start in 12th position and he struggled during the race as well as making contact with several drivers en route to 17th. He followed that up with fourteenth in Turkey, before a ninth-place finish in Spain – ahead of teammate Kamui Kobayashi in tenth – to take his first Formula One points.

He was seen holding his hands around his head in an attempt to protect it just before the final impact. The session was suspended, and marshals and medical personnel extricated Pérez from his car. A Sauber team spokesman said that he was conscious and able to talk after the accident, and had been taken to the circuit's medical centre. He suffered a sprained thigh and concussion, and did not take part in the race the following day, on medical grounds.

After a fifteenth place in Hungary, he retired in Belgium with suspension failure. This was followed by a gearbox failure while running seventh in Italy, before he scored a point in Singapore after losing ninth place to Felipe Massa. In Japan he took eighth place, before a sixteenth-place finish in Korea, tenth in India, and an eleventh-place finish in Abu Dhabi. He finished sixteenth in the Drivers' Championship with fourteen points.

On 28 July, it was announced that Pérez would remain with Sauber into the  season, alongside teammate Kobayashi. On 13 September, Pérez tested for Ferrari as part of the Ferrari Driver Academy in a Ferrari F60, Ferrari's car from the  season. Pérez conducted the test with fellow academy member Jules Bianchi.

2012 season

In the second round at Malaysia, he went on to battle with Fernando Alonso for the win. In the dying laps of the race he was able to close the gap to 0.5 seconds, but was not able to make the pass as he went wide at turn 14 and fell back, finishing 2.2 seconds behind Alonso in second. Many observers praised his performance despite his late-race error, taking Sauber's best result as an independent team. This drive won him plaudits and fuelled speculation of a move to Ferrari in the near future. However, Pérez later told reporters that he expected to stay with Sauber until at least the end of the 2012 season.

At the 2012 Chinese Grand Prix, he qualified a career-best eighth, but finished the race in eleventh place after problems with pit strategy and his car's clutch.

He improved to ninth place in the race, but raised poor qualifying form as an issue for the team. He later criticised the Venezuelan, claiming "Everybody has concerns about him" before adding, "He is a driver who doesn't know that we are risking our lives and has no respect at all". Maldonado received a double penalty in the form of a reprimand and a €10,000 fine after the race. Pérez later added: "Just look at the last races. He ruined [Lewis] Hamilton's race (in Valencia), he ruined my race in Monaco by doing stupid things. I don't understand why the stewards don't take a serious decision with him. With Pastor they're not doing anything that will teach him a lesson."

A penalty for Maldonado subsequently promoted Pérez to a career-best fourth on the grid. In the race, he was forced to retire in the first turn of the first lap after Romain Grosjean caused a spectacular accident. Grosjean crashed his car into Lewis Hamilton creating a domino effect which involved five cars. Also involved in the accident were, the championship leader Fernando Alonso and Pérez's teammate Kamui Kobayashi.

On Saturday, he failed to qualify for Q3 and was twelfth on the grid. On Sunday, he climbed through the field to second place, passing on track, among others, Kimi Räikkönen, Nico Rosberg, Felipe Massa and Alonso. Unlike most of the drivers in the field, Pérez started the race on hard tyres and changed to the medium tyres on lap 29, allowing him to lead the Grand Prix for five laps. As a result, Pérez and his car's outstanding tyre management got him well into the points, and ultimately, to a podium finish. Ultimately, he finished the season in tenth place in the Drivers' Championship with 66 points, 6 more than teammate Kobayashi.

McLaren (2013)

2013 season

On 28 September 2012, Lewis Hamilton's decision to leave McLaren for Mercedes in 2013 was announced, and Pérez was subsequently confirmed as Hamilton's replacement. He also replaced Hamilton in McLaren's cartoon Tooned. This also ended Pérez' association with Ferrari, as he was released from its driver academy.

In the season-opening race in Australia, Pérez qualified 15th and finished in 11th position, later describing the weekend as "difficult" for himself and the team as a whole. He also achieved the fastest lap of the race, having pitted for fresh tyres.

In the Bahrain GP, he started 12th on the grid and finished 6th ahead of Ferrari's Fernando Alonso (8th) and his teammate Jenson Button (10th), with whom he had a fierce duel in which they touched on a couple of occasions, increasing the competition between drivers in McLaren on the following races.

After the Bahrain Grand Prix, Jenson Button said of Pérez's driving style:

At the 2013 Monaco Grand Prix Pérez performed several aggressive overtaking moves, before retiring after colliding with Kimi Räikkönen. Following the incident Räikkönen said that Pérez should be "punched in the face". Pérez recorded a season-best fifth-place finish in India, finishing four seconds shy of the podium, a result that left him "extremely satisfied".

Pérez confirmed on 13 November 2013 that he would be leaving McLaren at the end of the season to be replaced by Kevin Magnussen. On 12 December 2013 (exactly a month after it was announced he would leave McLaren), Force India confirmed that Pérez would join Nico Hülkenberg in their driver line-up for 2014 in a 15 million Euro deal.

Force India (2014–2018)

On 12 December 2013, Pérez had his drive for Force India in  confirmed.

2014

Out-qualifying his teammate for a second time, Pérez started in the tenth position for the  however a first-lap collision with Jenson Button meant an early retirement for the first time in the season. On the last lap, he was involved in a collision with Felipe Massa, who crashed into the back of his Force India sending both cars heavily into the barriers. Pérez was subsequently given a five-place grid penalty for the next race, as the stewards decided he changed his racing line, causing Massa to crash into him.

Pérez stated that contract negotiations were "ongoing", in regards to a further contract extension.

2015

The 2015 season started with a 10th place for Pérez in Australia, followed by a 13th in Malaysia, an 11th in China and an eighth in Bahrain. He came fifth in Belgium and sixth in Italy. His best race of the season was in Russia, where he scored his first podium of 2015 and Force India's third-ever. At the 2015 Hungarian Grand Prix during the first practice session he suffered a rear suspension failure and lost control of his car which led to a barrel roll that destroyed his car, he was able to walk away from the accident unscathed. He finished the 2015 championship in ninth, his highest championship position to date, with 78 points. He outscored teammate Hülkenberg by 20 points. Besides the podium finish in Russia, he managed three further top-five finishes in Belgium, the US, and Abu Dhabi; he scored 63 of his 78 points in the final nine rounds. In the second half of the season, he out-qualified his teammate in six of the last nine races and eight times throughout the season.

2016

Pérez experienced a difficult start to the season for the first four races due to an uncompetitive VJM09, but scored points with a ninth-place in Russia. Upgrades were introduced in Barcelona with a seventh-place finish indicating an improvement in the team's form.

In Monaco, Pérez scored his sixth (and Force India's fourth) podium finish in wet and changing conditions and moved to ninth in the Drivers' Championship standings. Tyre management played a significant role but in contrast to previous occasions he pitted as many times as Ferrari and Red Bull, at times catching up with the front runners and managing to hold Sebastian Vettel in fourth at a comfortable distance.

In the European Grand Prix in Baku Pérez once again finished third, recovering from a gearbox change penalty as a result of a crash during free practice, having been fast enough to qualify on the front row. Despite having to start from seventh on the grid he made his way up to fourth before passing Kimi Räikkönen on the last lap of the race for third, making it his second podium in three races.

2017

After the 2016 Malaysian Grand Prix, Pérez confirmed he had committed to Force India for the 2017 season. He remained with the Indian team for a fourth consecutive season alongside new teammate Esteban Ocon, ending speculation of a possible move to Williams, Renault or Haas. He was very consistent with his highest finish in 2017 a fourth place in Spain after two rivals collided at the start, and a third retired mid-race with a power unit failure. He ended his streak of 17 points finishes as he ended up colliding with Daniil Kvyat in Monaco. He had a moment with his teammate in Canada when he would not allow his teammate through, who thought he could challenge Daniel Ricciardo for 3rd. He was again knocked out in Baku where he thought he could challenge for the win before colliding with Ocon. He finished 7th in Austria and moved up to 6th in the standings after Max Verstappen was out of the race on the first lap. He dropped to 7th in the championship after finishing 9th in Britain, behind his teammate and Verstappen finished 4th. He remained 7th in the standings for the rest of the season.

2018

Pérez finished the first three races of the season outside the points. He then achieved his eighth career podium finish at the Azerbaijan Grand Prix, finishing 3rd after an incident-strewn race. He passed then-championship leader Sebastian Vettel for 3rd place with a few laps to go, making him the first driver to finish on the podium twice at the Baku City Circuit (in 2016 and 2018). Another points finish came with 9th place in Spain. In France, he retired from the race with an engine failure. Three consecutive points finishes followed, with 7th-place finishes in Austria and Germany.

After the Hungarian Grand Prix, Force India was put into administration. This was caused by a group of creditors (including Pérez) taking legal action against the team. Pérez said that this action was taken to save the team and its employees from a winding-up order instigated by other creditors, which would have resulted in the team's collapse. Shortly before the Belgian Grand Prix, Force India's assets were purchased by a consortium of investors led by Lawrence Stroll, father of Williams driver Lance Stroll. The team was re-admitted into the championship as a new team—Racing Point Force India—keeping Pérez and Ocon as their drivers. At the Belgian Grand Prix, the team came back strong with Pérez and Ocon qualifying 4th and 3rd, and finishing 5th and 6th, respectively.

Pérez took seven points finishes from nine races in the second half of the season. However, he faced criticism after a poor performance in Singapore. He collided with his teammate Ocon on the opening lap, causing Ocon to crash into a wall and retire from the race. He also collided with Sergey Sirotkin, an action that resulted in a drive-through penalty. He later stated that he thought his penalty was "fair". He later suffered a brake failure and retired from his home race in Mexico. He ended the season in 8th place in the championship with 62 points, finishing ahead of teammate Ocon and being the only non-Mercedes, Ferrari or Red Bull driver to finish on the podium that season.

Racing Point (2019–2020)

2019 

The 2019 season saw Racing Point Force India become Racing Point, retaining Pérez as a driver. He was joined at the team by former Williams driver Lance Stroll. Racing Point saw 2019 as a transitional season, with much of the work on that year's car being disrupted by the administration events of the previous year. A strong start to the season, including a 6th-place finish in Azerbaijan, was followed by a string of eight races without points, the longest such string of his career. This included the rain-affected German Grand Prix, where he crashed out early in the race whilst teammate Stroll briefly led the race and eventually finished 4th.

In a similar manner to 2018, Pérez fared far better during the second half of the season. Except for a retirement in Singapore due to an oil leak, he scored points in every race after the summer break, including a strong 6th-place finish in Belgium. Many of these points finishes came from low initial grid positions, including a 7th-place finish in Italy after starting 18th, 8th in Japan from 17th, and 10th in the United States after starting from the pit lane.

He finished the season in 10th place in the championship with 52 points, comfortably ahead of teammate Stroll.

2020 

Pérez had signed a contract extension with Racing Point, for whom he was meant to continue racing until the end of 2022. Due to this, he was unable to participate in the British Grand Prix. He was temporarily replaced by Nico Hülkenberg. It was confirmed that he would also miss the 70th Anniversary Grand Prix, as he had again tested positive for COVID-19. After testing negative for COVID-19 after the 70th Anniversary Grand Prix, Pérez returned to race at the Spanish Grand Prix, he qualified fourth and finished the race in fifth position. In September 2020, Pérez announced that he would be leaving Racing Point at the end of the 2020 season. He would be replaced by Sebastian Vettel as Racing Point become Aston Martin for the  season.

Pérez achieved his ninth F1 podium at the Turkish Grand Prix. After qualifying third in the rain, Pérez passed Max Verstappen and went from third to second, only behind his teammate Lance Stroll, starting with full wet rain tyres and changing for intermediate tyres on lap 10 of 58. Pérez inherited the lead after Stroll made a pitstop, and on lap 37 he got overtaken by Lewis Hamilton for the lead. The podium was Hamilton, Pérez and Sebastian Vettel. Pérez was 3rd for the majority of the Bahrain Grand Prix after starting 5th, but an MGU-K electrical issue struck with only a few laps to go, forcing him to pull over and retire the car with flames billowing out of the power unit.

Since Pérez announced his departure from Racing Point there was support from the media for him, with The Race saying it will be a "huge injustice were Perez not to be on the 2021 grid.". Former F1 driver and Sky Sports F1 commentator, Martin Brundle, also echoed similar thoughts in his online column review the 2020 Turkish Grand Prix where Pérez finished second and suggested that Pérez "should be on Red Bull Racing's radar" to partner Max Verstappen in place of Alex Albon.

Pérez won his first race at the Sakhir Grand Prix, becoming Formula 1's 110th race winner. On the first lap, Pérez was hit by Leclerc and went from 2nd place to 18th and last. On lap 64 he took the lead and won the race ahead of Esteban Ocon and teammate Stroll. This was the first win for a Mexican driver since Pedro Rodríguez won the 1970 Belgian Grand Prix 50 years prior.

Pérez finished the season with 125 points, scoring one win and one podium. He finished fourth overall which was his best ever championship result before joining Red Bull Racing, which he would later equal in 2021.

Red Bull (2021–present)

2021

Pérez raced for Red Bull Racing in 2021, replacing Alex Albon - who was demoted to the role of reserve and test driver  - and partnering Max Verstappen.

At the 2021 Bahrain Grand Prix, Pérez made his debut with the Red Bull Racing team finishing in 5th place. During qualifying on Saturday he came 11th. During the formation lap for the race, his car switched off due to an electrical failure. He managed to reset his RB16B before having to start the race from the pitlane.

At the 2021 Emilia Romagna Grand Prix, Pérez qualified on the front row in 2nd place, just 0.035 seconds behind polesitter Lewis Hamilton, outqualifying his teammate Max Verstappen in P3. It was his first time starting on the front row in his career.

At the 2021 Azerbaijan Grand Prix, Pérez qualified in 7th place, starting in 6th place due to a grid penalty for Lando Norris. In the race he made a strong start, moving up to 3rd place by lap 8. In the pit stop window, he then passed Lewis Hamilton to take 2nd place. Having stayed in this position for most of the race, Pérez moved into the lead following a tyre failure for teammate Max Verstappen on lap 47. With the race restarting on lap 50, he remained in the lead for the final 2 laps to take the second win of his career and his first for Red Bull.

At the 2021 French Grand Prix, Pérez qualified in 4th place, starting behind Mercedes driver Valtteri Bottas. In the race, he conserved his tyres up to lap 24. Due to his fresher tyres, he then passed Bottas to take 3rd place on lap 49. It was the first time in his career that he scored podiums on consecutive weekends.

At the 2021 Styrian Grand Prix, Pérez qualified in 5th place, starting in 4th behind McLaren's Lando Norris after a penalty for Valtteri Bottas. He passed Norris early but lost a position to Bottas after a slow pitstop. Unable to pass the Mercedes, Pérez then switched strategies and pitted for fresh tyres and chased down Bottas in the final stages. He made up a 20-second deficit to catch Bottas on the final lap, but was unable to pass his rival for a 3rd consecutive finish on the podium and finished just half a second behind in 4th place.

On the way to the grid at the 2021 Belgian Grand Prix, Pérez crashed, having skidded into the barriers at Les Combes. Pérez's car was fixed in time for the start of the race, although he was required to start from the back. Ultimately, however, the race was red-flagged after just two laps under the safety car, resulting in a result of 20th place, although he was later promoted to 19th due to a penalty given to Lance Stroll.

At the Turkish Grand Prix, he finished third to score another podium finish, after an "intense" wheel to wheel battle with Lewis Hamilton in the wet.

At the United States Grand Prix, Perez had one of his most competitive weekends of the season, out-qualifying the Mercedes of Valtteri Bottas and starting 3rd behind teammate Verstappen and the other Mercedes of Lewis Hamilton, before finishing in the same position, albeit over 42 seconds behind eventual winner Verstappen, due to a drinks failure on the first lap.

In his home race in Mexico, Pérez took his third consecutive podium, for the first time in his career. In the closing stages of the race, he was able to pressure Lewis Hamilton for 2nd place, but he was unable to pass Hamilton before the chequered flag.

At the season finale in Abu Dhabi, Pérez's defensive work against Hamilton helped his teammate Max Verstappen close a seven second gap to Hamilton, which was crucial in Verstappen's title victory. Pérez retired from the race a few laps from the end because of suspected engine problems. Verstappen praised Perez after the race stating “It’s very rare to have a team mate like that ... he was a real team player and I really hope we can continue this for a long time.”

Pérez finished the season with 190 points, scoring 1 win and 5 podiums. He finished fourth overall, equalling his best championship result set in 2020.

2022

Pérez stayed at Red Bull for the 2022 season. In May 2022, shortly after his win in Monaco, it was announced Pérez would stay with the team until the end of the 2024 season.

He achieved his first pole position at the Saudi Arabian Grand Prix, on his 215th race start in Formula 1; therefore breaking the record for most races before a first pole position and also becoming the first Mexican driver to achieve a pole position in F1. He led the race until lap 16, where he pitted after coming under pressure from a potential undercut from Leclerc in 2nd. A crash from Nicholas Latifi on the same lap meant that the safety car was brought out, allowing Leclerc, Verstappen and Sainz to make a pitstop and keep track position, demoting Perez to 4th place, where he would finish the race.

At the Australian Grand Prix, Pérez qualified third. He lost a position at the start to Lewis Hamilton because of getting boxed in and got the position back on lap 10. He made his pitstop on lap 21 for hard tyres. Pérez passed Fernando Alonso and George Russell. On lap 39 his teammate Max Verstappen retired from the race due to mechanical problems and Pérez was then running second behind Charles Leclerc, which he held until the finish. Pérez got the sixteenth podium of his career and his sixth with Red Bull Racing.

In the next round, the Emilia Romagna Grand Prix, Pérez qualified 7th as he was unable set a representative time in Q3 due to red flags. He recovered to 3rd in the sprint race. He jumped up to 2nd on the opening lap of the race, after beating Charles Leclerc off the line. Throughout most of the race, Pérez successfully prevented Leclerc from re-overtaking him. After Leclerc spun, Pérez subsequently coasted to 2nd, behind teammate Max Verstappen. This gave Red Bull their first 1-2 finish since the 2016 Malaysian Grand Prix. 

At the Spanish Grand Prix, Pérez qualified 5th, citing not driving the car in FP1, where he was replaced by Jüri Vips. He overtook Carlos Sainz Jr. at the start and later fought with George Russell for third place, which turned into a battle for second after teammate Max Verstappen went wide. Pérez was unable to overtake Russell so he let Verstappen through, who too was unable to overtake Russell due to an issue with his DRS. On Lap 31, after not being allowed to switch with Verstappen by the team, Pérez overtook Russell on the medium tyres when his teammate pitted and took the lead of the race, Charles Leclerc having retired earlier. Pérez again let Verstappen through on lap 49, the team citing Verstappen being on the three stop compared to Pérez's two. Pérez finished in second place, behind Verstappen, giving Red Bull another 1-2 result. Pérez was initially unsatisfied with the team orders despite being satisfied with the result, saying "I’m definitely here to win and I think if I was on the three-stop, I should have won the race."

At the Monaco Grand Prix, Pérez qualified third, crashing at the Portier corner on his final attempt. The race started in wet conditions with everyone on the full wet tyres. On Lap 17, Pérez pitted onto intermediate tyres from third place, later taking the lead on Lap 22 after Sainz pitted. Pérez pit the same lap for the slick hard tyres, and still emerged in the lead after a good out-lap. After a red flag, Pérez restarted the race on medium tyres. His tyres degraded quickly and both Ferrari cars and his teammate were right behind him, but unable to overtake. The race hit the three-hour limit, and Pérez held on to win the third race of his Formula One career, from Sainz and his teammate Verstappen.

Pérez qualified 2nd for the Azerbaijan Grand Prix, 2 tenths behind Charles Leclerc due to power loss and lack of a tow. In the race he jumped Leclerc on the start and built a 2.5 second gap, which he maintained until his teammate Max Verstappen overtook him on Lap 14 after the order “no fighting” was issued to Pérez if Verstappen were to try to overtake him. Pérez was unable to keep up with Verstappen, attributing it to tyre degradation. He finished 2nd to Verstappen, with Leclerc having retired. Pérez scored the 20th podium of his Formula One career.

At the British Grand Prix, Pérez started fourth. Due to a turn four crash he was forced to pit for a new front wing which dropped him down to 17th. After a safety car, he recovered and was battling Lewis Hamilton and Charles Leclerc for second, where he ultimately finished. He also was voted the 'Driver of the day'.

At the Belgian Grand Prix, Pérez qualified third but was promoted to second due to his teammate's grid penalties. Team principal Christian Horner said it was tactical to not start on the pole due to the slipstream effect, which could help a driver take the lead going into the Les Combes corner. Pérez had a bad start and was attacked by the two Mercedes cars, but eventually moved back into second. After the pit stops played out, Pérez ultimately finished second behind his teammate Verstappen, giving Red Bull another 1-2 finish.

Pérez qualified second for the Singapore Grand Prix behind Charles Leclerc. He overtook Leclerc at the start and led every lap. The race was shortened to 59 laps because of the 3 hour time limit due to safety cars and an hour-long delay. He won with a 7.5 second advantage to Leclerc. Post-race, he was investigated for a safety car infringement; ultimately his win was allowed to stand, with him receiving a reprimand and a 5 second penalty. He was voted Driver of the Day at the same Grand Prix.

At the Japanese Grand Prix, Pérez qualified fourth. In the race, Carlos Sainz Jr. retired after a crash, meaning Pérez ran third for most of the race. On the final lap, he pressured second placed Charles Leclerc into a mistake. Leclerc cut across the Casio Triangle, and blocked Pérez from making an overtake. Leclerc was awarded a 5 second time penalty, which elevated Pérez to second in the race, giving Red Bull their fifth 1-2 result of the season. The penalty also meant his teammate Max Verstappen won the championship.

At his home race in Mexico, Pérez qualified fourth and overtook George Russell to once again finish on the podium in third place, behind Lewis Hamilton and teammate Verstappen.

During the next round in São Paulo, Pérez qualified ninth under tricky circumstances, elevating himself to fifth place during the Sprint race. In the race he managed to run third for most of the time, but was caught out by a Safety Car with himself on Medium tyres compared to everyone else's Soft tyres. With an already slow car, Pérez dropped back to sixth place. He let teammate Verstappen past with the understanding that Verstappen would let Pérez back past if he couldn't gain any positions, due to Pérez' fight with Leclerc for second place in the drivers championship. Verstappen didn't let Pérez back past, which left Pérez disappointed. Post race Pérez said the matter was "discussed internally" and they are going to put it "behind" themselves.

At the final round in Abu Dhabi, Pérez and Leclerc were tied on 280 points for second place. In qualifying, Pérez received a tow from his teammate on his final flying lap and qualified second, ahead of Leclerc. During the race, Pérez switched to a two stop pitstop strategy, pitting opposite of Leclerc. He lost time fighting Sebastian Vettel and Fernando Alonso, as he went wide at the chicane while attempting an overtake. He later made the same mistake while overtaking Lewis Hamilton, again losing time. Finally, he was held up by Pierre Gasly who was getting lapped, but was engaged in a battle of his own didn't quickly concede the position. Eventually Pérez finished 1.4 seconds behind Leclerc in third place which meant he ended up third in the 2022 Drivers Standings.

Pérez finished the season with 305 points, with 2 wins, 1 pole position, 11 podiums and 3 fastest laps, his best season in Formula 1 yet.

2023

At the season opener in Bahrain, Pérez was even with teammate Verstappen in their last qualifying laps until the final corners, where oversteer moments cost him pole by nearly 0.15 seconds. In the race, he initially lost position to Charles Leclerc, which he later recovered. He then finished second, about 11 seconds behind Verstappen.

At the Saudi Arabian Grand Prix, Verstappen had a technical issue that saw him knocked out in Q2. Pérez then went on to take his second career pole position. He lost position to Fernando Alonso at the start, which he quickly regained. Teammate Verstappen climbed up to 2nd place from 15th, but Pérez' slightly faster pace meant he won the race by nearly 5 seconds, his fifth career victory.

Karting record

Karting career summary

Racing record

Racing career summary 

† Includes points scored by other drivers.
 Season still in progress.

Complete A1 Grand Prix results
(key) (Races in bold indicate pole position; races in italics indicate fastest lap)

Complete GP2 Asia Series results
(key) (Races in bold indicate pole position; races in italics indicate fastest lap)

Complete GP2 Series results
(key) (Races in bold indicate pole position; races in italics indicate fastest lap)

Complete Formula One results
(key) (Races in bold indicate pole position; races in italics indicate fastest lap)

 Did not finish, but was classified as he had completed more than 90% of the race distance.
 Season still in progress.

References

External links

 
 Sergio Pérez's Racing Point profile 
 

1990 births
Living people
Sportspeople from Guadalajara, Jalisco
Mexican expatriate sportspeople in Germany
Mexican expatriate sportspeople in Switzerland
Mexican Formula One drivers
Mexican racing drivers
British Formula Three Championship drivers
A1 Team Mexico drivers
GP2 Series drivers
Formula BMW ADAC drivers
GP2 Asia Series drivers
Sauber Formula One drivers
McLaren Formula One drivers
Force India Formula One drivers
Racing Point Formula One drivers
Racing Point Force India Formula One drivers
Formula One race winners
Mexican Roman Catholics
Red Bull Formula One drivers
Mücke Motorsport drivers
T-Sport drivers
Campos Racing drivers
Arden International drivers